The Nastro d'Argento (Silver Ribbon) is a film award assigned each year, since 1948, by Sindacato Nazionale dei Giornalisti Cinematografici Italiani, the association of Italian film critics.

History 
The union of film journalists was founded in the same year in which the Nastri were born, 1946, by a group of film journalists and essayists, some of whom later became directors (Steno and Mario Soldati, who was its first president) and authors (Michelangelo Antonioni, Antonio Pietrangeli). The first regulation motivated the establishment of the Silver Ribbon to "promote the continuous artistic, technical and industrial improvement of Italian cinema and pay homage to its relevant acquisitions".

It was delivered for the first time in 1946 in Rome, at the Hotel de Russie. The editions were held mainly between Rome and Taormina, with the exception of some particular editions (in Florence, after the 1966 flood, as a sign of solidarity) and, always in its first years of life, also in Sorrento.

In the first editions, the prizes were awarded to the films presented during the year considered by the industry, the one that ends with the end of the season; they were then attributed to the films released in the calendar year, while subsequently they were again assigned to the films released in theaters within the days immediately following the Cannes Film Festival, therefore within the last days of May, when the 'five' finalists are announced to which an event with all the candidates for the awards is dedicated. 

After a few editions in the headquarters of the French Academy in Villa Medici, it is held, also in Rome, in the space of the MAXXI Museum. The prizes are awarded on the basis of 'five' proposed by the national board of the Union to the vote (notarial) of the members of the union, film journalists of the press, television, radio and Internet.

The delivery of the Silver Ribbons is combined with the Guglielmo Biraghi prizes awarded since 2001, destined for the best of the young new actors in the cinema of the year.

1940s and 1950s 

 1948: Gaspare Cataldo, Pala & Alberto Vecchietti  - The Brothers Karamazov
 1949: Vittorio De Sica, Cesare Zavattini, Suso Cecchi D'Amico, Oreste Biancoli, Adolfo Franci & Gerardo Guerrieri – Ladri di biciclette
 1950: Suso Cecchi D'Amico, Cesare Zavattini & Renato Castellani – It's Forever Springtime
 1951: Cesare Zavattini & Alessandro Blasetti – Prima comunione
 1952: Ettore Maria Margadonna, Titina De Filippo & Renato Castellani – Due soldi di speranza
 1953: not assigned
 1954: Vitaliano Brancati, Sergio Amidei, Vincenzo Talarico & Luigi Zampa – Anni facili
 1955: not assigned
 1956: Pasquale Festa Campanile, Massimo Franciosa & Giuseppe Mancione – Gli innamorati
 1957: Cesare Zavattini – The Roof
 1958: Valerio Zurlini, Leo Benvenuti, Piero De Bernardi & Alberto Lattuada – Guendalina
 1959: Age & Scarpelli, Suso Cecchi D'Amico & Mario Monicelli – I soliti ignoti

1960s 
 1960: Ennio De Concini, Alfredo Giannetti & Pietro Germi – Un maledetto imbroglio
 1961: Pasquale Festa Campanile, Suso Cecchi D'Amico, Massimo Franciosa, Enrico Medioli & Luchino Visconti- Rocco and His Brothers
 1962: Ennio De Concini, Alfredo Giannetti & Pietro Germi – Divorzio all'italiana
 1963: Pasquale Festa Campanile, Massimo Franciosa, Carlo Bernari & Nanni Loy- Le quattro giornate di Napoli
 1964: Ennio Flaiano, Tullio Pinelli, Brunello Rondi & Federico Fellini – 8½
 1965: Age & Scarpelli, Luciano Vincenzoni & Pietro Germi – Seduced and Abandoned
 1966: Ruggero Maccari, Ettore Scola & Antonio Pietrangeli – Io la conoscevo bene
 1967: Age & Scarpelli, Luciano Vincenzoni & Pietro Germi – Signore & signori
 1968: Ugo Pirro & Elio Petri – A ciascuno il suo
 1969: Dino Maiuri, Massimo De Rita & Carlo Lizzani – Banditi a Milano

1970s 
 1970: Fabio Carpi & Nelo Risi – Diario di una schizofrenica
 1971: , Tullio Kezich, Alberto Lattuada & Piero Chiara – Venga a prendere il caffè da noi
 1972: Leo Benvenuti, Piero De Bernardi & Nino Manfredi – Per grazia ricevuta
 1973: Alberto Bevilacqua – Questa specie d'amore
 1974: Tonino Guerra & Federico Fellini – Amarcord
 1975: Age & Scarpelli & Ettore Scola – C'eravamo tanto amati
 1976: Tullio Pinelli, Leo Benvenuti, Piero De Bernardi & Pietro Germi – Amici miei
 1977: Sergio Amidei & Mario Monicelli – Un borghese piccolo piccolo
 1978: Ruggero Maccari, Ettore Scola & Maurizio Costanzo – Una giornata particolare
 1979: Ermanno Olmi – L'albero degli zoccoli

1980s 
 1980: Age & Scarpelli & Ettore Scola – La terrazza
 1981: Ruggero Maccari & Ettore Scola – Passione d'amore
 1982: Tullio Pinelli, Leo Benvenuti, Piero De Bernardi, Bernardino Zapponi & Mario Monicelli- Il marchese del Grillo
 1983: Paolo & Vittorio Taviani, Tonino Guerra & Giuliani G. De Negri – La notte di San Lorenzo
 1984: Elvio Porta & Nanni Loy – Mi manda Picone
 1985: Paolo & Vittorio Taviani & Tonino Guerra – Kaos
 1986: Tullio Pinelli, Leo Benvenuti, Piero De Bernardi, Suso Cecchi D'Amico & Mario Monicelli- Speriamo che sia femmina
 1987: Ruggero Maccari, Ettore Scola & Furio Scarpelli – La famiglia
 1988: Massimo Troisi & Anna Pavignano – Le vie del Signore sono finite
 1989: Tullio Kezich & Ermanno Olmi – La leggenda del santo bevitore

1990s 
 1990: Pupi Avati – The Story of Boys & Girls
 1991: Suso Cecchi D'Amico & Tonino Guerra – Il male oscuro
 1992: Andrea Barbato & Emidio Greco – Una storia semplice
 1993: Stefano Rulli, Sandro Petraglia & Gianni Amelio – Il ladro di bambini
 1994: Francesca Archibugi – Il grande cocomero
 1995: Alessandro D'Alatri – Senza pelle
 1996: Leone Pompucci, Filippo Pichi & Paolo Rossi – Camerieri
 1997: Giovanni Veronesi & Leonardo Pieraccioni – Il ciclone
 1998: Vincenzo Cerami & Roberto Benigni – La vita è bella
 1999: Giuseppe Tornatore – La leggenda del pianista sull'oceano

2000s 
 2000:  & Silvio Soldini – Bread and Tulips
  & Pupi Avati – 
 Bernardo Bertolucci & Clare Peploe – L'assedio
 Enzo Monteleone & Angelo Orlando – Ormai è fatta!
 Gabriele Muccino & Adele Tulli – Come te nessuno mai
 2001: Claudio Fava, Marco Tullio Giordana & Monica Zapelli  – I cento passi
 Francesca Archibugi – Domani
 Leonardo Fasoli & Gianluca Maria Tavarelli – Qui non è il paradiso
 Linda Ferri, Nanni Moretti &   – La stanza del figlio
 Ferzan Ozpetek &  – Le fate ignoranti
 2002: Giulia Calenda, Cristina Comencini & Lucilla Schiaffino – Il più bel giorno della mia vita
 Marco Bellocchio – L'ora di religione
 Emanuele Crialese – Respiro
 Enzo D'Alò &  – Momo
 Paolo Sorrentino – One Man Up
 2003: Gabriele Muccino &  – Ricordati di me
 Niccolò Ammaniti & Francesca Marciano – Io non ho paura
 Massimo D'Anolfi & Roberta Torre – Angela
 Roberto Faenza – The Soul Keeper
 Enzo Monteleone – El Alamein - The Line of Fire
 Ferzan Ozpetek &  – La finestra di fronte
 2004: Sandro Petraglia & Stefano Rulli – La meglio gioventù
 Franco Battiato & Manlio Sgalambro Perdutoamor
 Marco Bellocchio – Buongiorno, notte
  – 
 Francesco Bruni  & Paolo Virzì  – Caterina va in città
 2005: Sergio Castellitto & Margaret Mazzantini – Non ti muovere
 Gianni Amelio, Sandro Petraglia & Stefano Rulli – Le chiavi di casa
 Pupi Avati – La rivincita di Natale
 Davide Ferrario – After Midnight
 2006:  & Giovanni Veronesi – Manuale d'amore
 Alessandro D'Alatri, Gennaro Nunziante & Domenico Starnone – The Fever
 Sandro Petraglia, Stefano Rulli, Giancarlo De Cataldo & Michele Placido – Romanzo criminale
 Giuseppe Rocca, Laura Sabatino &  – The Remains of Nothing
 Gabriele Salvatores & Fabio Scamoni – Quo Vadis, Baby?
 2007: Ferzan Ozpetek &  – Saturno contro
 Antonio Capuano – La guerra di Mario
 Emanuele Crialese – Nuovomondo
 Linda Ferri, Federico Starnone, Francesco Giammusso & Kim Rossi Stuart – Anche libero va bene
 Mario Monicelli,  &  – Le rose del deserto
 Giuseppe Tornatore – La sconosciuta
 2008: Sandro Petraglia – La ragazza del lago with Daniele Luchetti & Stefano Rulli – Mio fratello è figlio unico
 Francesco Bruni & Paolo Virzì – Tutta la vita davanti
 Peter Del Monte & Michele Pellegrini – Nelle tue mani
 , Francesco Piccolo,  & Silvio Soldini – Days and Clouds
 Michele Pellegrini & Gianni Zanasi – Non pensarci
 2009: Paolo Sorrentino – Il Divo
Francesca Archibugi – A Question of the Heart
Maurizio Braucci, Gianni Di Gregorio & Matteo Garrone – Gomorrah
Fausto Brizzi, Massimiliano Bruno &  – Ex
Jim Carrington,  & Marco Risi – Fortapàsc

2010s 
 2010: Francesco Bruni, Francesco Piccolo & Paolo Virzì – La prima cosa bella
Ivan Cotroneo, Ferzan Ozpetek – Mine vaganti
Alessandro Genovesi & Gabriele Salvatores – Happy Family
Gabriele Muccino – Baciami ancora
Sandro Petraglia, Stefano Rulli & Daniele Luchetti – La nostra vita
 2011:  – Benvenuti al Sud
Massimiliano Bruno & Edoardo Falcone with the collaboration of Fausto Brizzi – Escort in Love
Antonio Capuano – Dark Love (L'amore buio)
Daniele Gaglianone – Pietro
Pasquale Scimeca & Nennella Buonaiuto with the collaboration of Tonino Guerra – Malavoglia
 2012: Marco Tullio Giordana, Sandro Petraglia & Stefano Rulli – Romanzo di una strage
 Carlo Verdone,  & Maruska Albertazzi – A Flat for Three
 Daniele Vicari & Laura Paolucci – Diaz - Don't Clean Up This Blood
 Paolo Sorrentino &  – This Must Be the Place
 Francesco Bruni – Scialla! (Stai sereno)
 2013: Roberto Andò &  – Viva la libertà
 Marco Bellocchio, Veronica Raimo & Stefano Rulli – Bella addormentata
 Giuseppe Piccioni & Francesca Manieri – The Red and the Blue
 Paolo Sorrentino &  – La grande bellezza
 Giuseppe Tornatore – La migliore offerta

See also 
 Cinema of Italy

References

External links 
 Italian National Syndicate of Film Journalists official site  

Screenplay
Screenwriting awards for film